The Naval War College Distinguished Graduate leadership Award was established in 1996 by the Trustees of the Naval War College Foundation to honor United States Naval War College graduates who have attained positions of prominence in the field of national security.

Criteria
The criteria for selection of the Distinguished Graduate include attainment of a position of senior leadership in government service, career accomplishments which are inspiring to Naval War College students, and an expressed interest in professional military education. His graduation from the Naval War College and exemplary service in the United States Army are marks of professionalism which this award is intended to recognize.

Award Recipients
1996: General John M. Shalikashvili, USA, Chairman of the Joint Chiefs of Staff
1997: Admiral Joseph W. Prueher, USN, Commander-in-Chief, U.S. Pacific Command
1998: Admiral Robert E. Kramek, USCG, Commandant of the USCG
1999: General Charles E. Wilhelm, USMC, Commander, U.S. Southern Command
2000: Admiral Robert J. Natter, USN, Commander, U.S. Atlantic Fleet
2001: Admiral William J. Fallon, USN, Vice Chief of Naval Operations
2002: Colonel Charles J. Precourt, Chief of NASA’s Astronaut Corps
2003: Admiral Gregory G. Johnson, USN, Commander, U.S. Naval Forces, Europe/Commander, Allied Forces, Southern Europe
2004: General Michael W. Hagee, USMC, Commandant, United States Marine Corps
2005: Christopher R. Hill, Assistant Secretary of State for East Asian and Pacific Affairs
2006: Vice Admiral David L. Brewer III, USN, Commander, Military Sealift Command
2007: Admiral James G. Stavridis, USN, Commander, U.S. Southern Command
2008: General James E. Cartwright, USMC, Vice Chairman, Joint Chiefs of Staff
2009: General Raymond T. Odierno, USA, U.S. Forces - Iraq
2010: Admiral Robert J. Papp, Jr., Commandant, U.S. Coast Guard
2011: Doctor Clifford L. Stanley, USMC (ret.), Under Secretary of Defense for Personnel and Readiness
2012: Admiral James A. Winnefeld, Jr., USN, Vice Chairman, Joint Chiefs of Staff

References
U.S. Naval War College official website

Naval War College
1996 establishments in the United States
Awards established in 1996